Michele Pini (born 23 August 1986 in Italy) is an Italian footballer.

Career

In 2015, at the age of 28, Pini retired from football, leaving Lumezzane to work at a factory because the latter earned more money.

References

External links
 

Italian footballers
Association football midfielders
Association football defenders
1986 births
Living people
F.C. Lumezzane V.G.Z. A.S.D. players